Christo Ferro Liebenberg (born 2 October 1934) is a South African banker who was Minister for Finance of South Africa, from 19 September 1994 to 4 April 1996, in the government of national unity chaired by Nelson Mandela.

He was born in Touws River in the Western Cape. His father worked on the railway lines. Touws River was one of the biggest railway junctions of that time in South Africa. He was educated at Worcester Boys' High School, Harvard Business School AMP, INSEAD and Cranfield University.

He started working at Nedcor Bank in 1952 as a messenger. He worked his way up until 1994 when he retired as CEO of Nedbank after serving for four years.

Nelson Mandela asked him to take over from Finance Minister Derek Keys in 1994.

As he was not affiliated to any political party, President Nelson Mandela changed the constitution to accommodate Liebenberg as Finance Minister.

As per agreement, he stayed for a certain period after which the position then went to Trevor Manuel.

References

Living people
1934 births
Afrikaner people
South African people of German descent
South African people of Dutch descent
Finance ministers of South Africa
INSEAD alumni
South African chief executives
South African bankers
Alumni of Cranfield University